ONE (formerly named Sony ONE) is a Southeast Asian pay television channel owned by KC Global Media Asia. It is available in Malaysia, Singapore, Brunei Darussalam and Indonesia. It was launched on 1 October 2010 at 21:00 SST (20:00 WIB).

The channel's programming consists on Korean-language series and shows, provided by Seoul Broadcasting System (SBS) and as of most recent Munhwa Broadcasting Corporation (MBC) alongside with Viu (linear TV rights for Viu Original K-dramas). ONE's programming is available subtitled in local languages on optional subtitle tracks, depending on the country of reception's market. From October 2017, the contents provided were only available on Singapore and Malaysia until July 31, 2020.

In January 2020, Sony Pictures Television sold the channel, along with the Southeast Asian channels Animax, GEM (joined March 2020) and AXN  to KC Global Media.

Logo 
On 1 December 2016, the channel was rebranded as Sony ONE, with a new logo based on the Sony Channel corporate image. On 17 March 2020, both GEM and ONE have been rebranded, now having a newer typeface for the logo and omitting the stylised "S" logo as Sony sold the channels to KC Global Media in Singapore and Hong Kong.

See also
 AXN 
 Animax 
 GEM

References

External links
 Official Site
 

Television channels and stations established in 2010
Seoul Broadcasting System television networks
Pay television
Television networks in South Korea
Television channels in South Korea
Korean-language television stations
2010 establishments in Singapore